Arthur Edward Joseph Noel, 4th Earl of Gainsborough OBE TD (30 June 1884 – 27 August 1927) was a British peer.

Early life
Arthur Noel was the son of Charles Noel, 3rd Earl of Gainsborough and his wife Mary Elizabeth Dease, (her sister was the writer Alice Dease), and a great-great-grandson of King William IV.  He succeeded to the earldom on his father's death in 1926.

Career
In 1903 Viscount Campden was commissioned in the Territorial Army Reserve in the Gloucestershire Regiment and fought in France in the First World War as a major.  He was decorated with the Territorial Decoration (TD) and was invested as an Officer of the Order of the British Empire (OBE) in 1919.  He was Private Chamberlain to Pope Benedict XV and Pope Pius XI.

Gainsborough was a Justice of the Peace (JP) for Rutland.

Personal life and death
Gainsborough married Alice Mary Eyre on 10 November 1915.  They had three children:

 Lady Maureen Thérèse Josephine Noel (born 7 March 1917, died 25 November 2009), married firstly Charles Walter James Dormer, 15th Baron Dormer and secondly Peregrine Edward Launcelot Fellowes through whom she was the step-mother of Julian Kitchener-Fellowes, Baron Fellowes of West Stafford.
 Anthony Gerard Edward Noel, 5th Earl of Gainsborough (born 24 October 1923, died 29 December 2009)
 Gerard Eyre Wriothesley Noel (born 20 November 1926, died 27 July 2016), a former editor of The Catholic Herald.

Gainsborough died on 27 August 1927, aged 43 and was succeeded in the earldom and other titles by his elder son, Anthony.

Ancestry

References

External links

1884 births
1927 deaths
4
Officers of the Order of the British Empire
Arthur
Gloucestershire Regiment officers